Woodford County High School may refer to::

Woodford County High School (Kentucky), United States, a coeducational public school in Versailles, Kentucky, serving all of Woodford County
Woodford County High School For Girls, a girls' school in the London Borough of Redbridge, United Kingdom